Chazuta District is one of fourteen districts of the province San Martín in Peru. San Martín Province is located in north central Peru, in San Martín Region, a highland area on the edge of the Amazon Basin. Immediately to the east of San Martín Region is the large lowland region of Loreto, in the northeast corner of Peru.

References